Ben W. Jobe (March 2, 1933 – March 10, 2017) was an American basketball coach.  He was best known as the head coach of the Southern University Jaguars – a position he held for 12 years. He has also been head coach of the men's college basketball teams at Tuskegee University, Talladega College, Alabama State University, South Carolina State University, University of Denver and Alabama A&M University.  Jobe has also served as assistant coach at the University of South Carolina, Georgia Tech, and briefly served as an assistant with the NBA's Denver Nuggets.

Early career 
Ben Jobe was raised in Nashville, Tennessee.  He attended Pearl High School in Nashville where he was a successful basketball player. In 1950, Jobe earned all-district and all-state honors and was then named to the 1951 all-national high school team.

Jobe then enrolled at Fisk University, earning All-Southern Intercollegiate Athletic Conference honors during his junior and senior seasons. He earned a bachelor's degree from Fisk in 1956 and later went on to earn a master's degree from Tennessee State University.  In 1958, Jobe began his coaching career at Cameron High School in Nashville, Tennessee. His first (and only) Cameron team won 24 games, a school record.  After the season was over, Jobe decided to move to Sierra Leone, West Africa, to coach a junior college basketball team. Jobe's coaching had a quick effect: his teams posted back-to-back undefeated seasons.

Jobe returned to the United States and began coaching at Talladega College in Alabama, a position which he held for three years.

Coach of Southern University Jaguars 
Ben Jobe took the helm of the Southern University Jaguars in 1986. He stayed on until 1996.  He returned again to Southern in 2001 for two more seasons, retiring completely from college basketball in 2003.  In 12 years at Southern, Jobe compiled a 209-141 record, led the Jaguars to the NCAA tournament four times, went to the National Invitational Tournament (NIT) once, won five Southern Intercollegiate Athletic Conference Championships, won 11 Southwestern Athletic Conference Championships.

Perhaps his most memorable moment as a college basketball coach was the Jaguars' 93-78 win over the then ACC Champions, Georgia Tech Yellow Jackets, during the first round of the 1993 NCAA tournament in Tucson, Arizona.

Jobe coached former San Antonio Spurs star guard (former coach of the Brooklyn Nets and Dallas Mavericks) Avery Johnson and late Charlotte Hornets player Bobby Phills.

Upon his retirement from Southern in 2003, Jobe had accumulated 524 wins as a head coach in college basketball spread among 8 teams over 31 seasons (a 0.611 win percentage).

Family and death
Jobe and his wife, Regina, had two children, Bryan and Gina.

Jobe died on March 10, 2017, with his funeral held at Resurrection Church in Montgomery, Alabama.

Head coaching record

References 

1933 births
2017 deaths
Alabama A&M Bulldogs basketball coaches
Alabama State Hornets basketball coaches
American men's basketball coaches
American men's basketball players
Basketball coaches from Tennessee
Basketball players from Nashville, Tennessee
College men's basketball head coaches in the United States
Denver Nuggets assistant coaches
Denver Pioneers men's basketball coaches
Fisk Bulldogs basketball players
Georgia Tech Yellow Jackets men's basketball coaches
South Carolina Gamecocks men's basketball coaches
South Carolina State Bulldogs basketball coaches
Southern Jaguars basketball coaches
Sportspeople from Nashville, Tennessee
Talladega Tornadoes men's basketball coaches
Tennessee State University alumni
Tuskegee Golden Tigers men's basketball coaches